Mansour Hobeika (December 20, 1941 in Hadath Baalbek, Beqaa Governorate, Lebanon – October 28, 2014 in Paris, France) was a Maronite bishop of the Maronite Catholic Eparchy of Zahleh in Lebanon.

Life

Mansour Hobeika studied philosophy and theology at Saint Joseph University in Beirut from 1962 to 1968. He holds degrees in literature, philosophy, theology and psychology. Ordained to the priesthood on June 9, 1968, he studied canon law at the Instituto per l'Oriente Carlo Alfonso Nallino in Rome and in the Angelicum, obtained his doctorate in Oriental Canon law in Rome. He taught at the Université La Sagesse, graduating himself from a course in Islamic studies and Arabic language. In addition to Arabic, he also spoke French, Italian, German and English.
Hobeika was appointed bishop of the Maronite Eparchy of Zahleh, Lebanon, on September 12, 2002 by Pope John Paul II and was ordained bishop on October 26, 2002 by the hands of Maronite Patriarch of Antioch, Cardinal Nasrallah Boutros Sfeir. His co-consecrators were Roland Aboujaoudé, auxiliary bishop of Antioch and Chucrallah Harb, Emeritus Eparch of Jounieh.

Hobeika died on October 28, 2014.

Sources

 Who's who in Lebanon 2005, p. 161.
 Annuario Pontificio 2007, p. 827.

Notes

External links

 http://www.gcatholic.org/dioceses/diocese/zahl1.htm

1941 births
2014 deaths
Jurists of religious law
Academic staff of Université La Sagesse
Lebanese Eastern Catholic bishops
21st-century Maronite Catholic bishops
Eastern Catholic bishops in Lebanon